Senator May may refer to:

Clark W. May (1869–1908), West Virginia State Senate
Edgar May (1929–2012), Vermont State Senate
Rachel May (fl. 1970s–2010s), New York State Senate
Ron May (Colorado legislator) (born 1934), Colorado State Senate